Mielke is a German surname.

Name Meaning:
Eastern German (of Slavic origin): from a pet form of a Slavic compound personal name with the first element Milo-, from mil ‘favor’, ‘grace’. Dutch: from a pet form of Miele 3.

Similar surnames: Miele, Bielke, Milko, Milke, Milk, Ziemke, Hilke, Zielke, Milkey

Notable people with the surname include:

 Benjamin Mielke (born 1981), German bobsledder
 Erich Mielke (1907 – 2000), Head of the East-German Stasi 1957-1989
 Gary Mielke (born 1963), American Baseball player
 Günter Mielke (1942 – 2010), West German long-distance runner
 Janet Soergel Mielke (born 1937), American politician
 Marcus Mielke (born 1975), German rower
 Rüdiger Mielke, German footballer

References

German-language surnames